The Gay & Lesbian Fund for Colorado, a program of the Gill Foundation, provides financial support to nonprofit organizations in Colorado. Current grant making through the Gay & Lesbian Fund includes STEM education, promoting fair lending practices, access to safe capital, and financial literacy, support for Colorado public broadcasting stations, and statewide LGBT service and advocacy organizations. Based in Denver with the Gill Foundation, the Gay & Lesbian Fund for Colorado has awarded more than $52 million in grants since its inception.

History

The Gill Foundation launched the Gay & Lesbian Fund for Colorado program in 1996. In 2009, the Gay & Lesbian Fund for Colorado won the Outstanding Foundation Award from the Colorado Nonprofit Association.

In 2011, the Gill Foundation closed its Colorado Springs office housing the Gay & Lesbian Fund for Colorado and moved all services to its Denver office during a period of strategic re-evaluation. In July 2012, the Gill Foundation gifted its Colorado Springs building to Rocky Mountain PBS to create the Tim Gill Center for Public Media.

Today 

Today, the Gay & Lesbian Fund for Colorado encompasses all Colorado programs and grants of the Gill Foundation, as well as a new program area in science, technology, engineering and math (STEM) education.

Leadership

Brad Clark, President & CEO, Gill Foundation
Denise Whinnen, Director of Colorado Programs

Awards
 2009: National Philanthropy Day in Colorado, Outstanding Foundation
 2009: Colorado College, Community Diversity Award (Mary Lou Makepeace)
 2008: Colorado Women's Hall of Fame Inductee (Mary Lou Makepeace) 
 2007: Latin American Research and Service Agency: Bernie Valdez Corporate Award
 2007: NEWSED Community Development Corporation and Santa Fe Drive Redevelopment Corporation: Celebrate Culture Civil Rights Award
 2007: Greater Colorado Springs Chamber of Commerce: ATHENA Award (Mary Lou Makepeace)
 2006: Denver Business Journal: Outstanding Woman in Business, "Nonprofits and Public Entities" sector (Mary Lou Makepeace)
 2006: Colorado Springs Hispanic Chamber of Commerce: Non-Profit Organization of the Year

See also
LGBT rights in the United States
List of LGBT rights organizations

References

 Colorado Springs Independent: Changing tack, the Gay and Lesbian Fund moves into some unexpected areas , July 17, 2013
 CausePlanet.org: Altering the Course of History: Collaborations Make Good, Sept. 5, 2008
 CausePlanet.org: Looking at Diversity in a New Way, April 2, 2007.
 Denver Business Journal: Strategies and Business-Like Approaches Help with Fundraising, October 14, 2005.

External links
 Gay & Lesbian Fund Homepage

LGBT political advocacy groups in Colorado